Schoenobiodes strata is a moth in the family Crambidae. It was described by Schultze in 1907. It is found in the Philippines.

References

Crambinae
Moths described in 1907